Carlinville Township (T10N R7W) is located in Macoupin County, Illinois, United States. As of the 2010 census, its population was 6,665 and it contained 2,947 housing units.

Geography

Demographics

Adjacent townships
 South Otter Township (north)
 Nilwood Township (northeast)
 Shaws Point Township (east)
 Honey Point Township (southeast)
 Brushy Mound Township (south)
 Polk Township (southwest)
 Bird Township (west)
 South Palmyra Township (northwest)

References

External links
City-data.com
Illinois State Archives

Townships in Macoupin County, Illinois
Townships in Illinois